James Hurst (born December 17, 1991) is an American football offensive tackle for the New Orleans Saints of the National Football League (NFL). He was signed by the Baltimore Ravens as an undrafted free agent in 2014. He played college football at North Carolina.

High school career
A former standout at Plainfield High School, Hurst was named to the 2009 USA Today All-American team, and played in the Under Armour All-America Game.

College career

Freshman
As a freshman, Hurst earned freshman All-American honors by Rivals.com, Phil Steele, and The Sporting News. He appeared in all 13 games and started at left tackle in all but the first game. He graded out at a team high of 83% and was third on the team with 33 knock-down blocks.

Professional career

Baltimore Ravens
Hurst signed with the Baltimore Ravens as an undrafted free agent on May 10, 2014.

Hurst became a full-time starter for the Ravens in 2017, starting all 16 games at left guard.

On March 12, 2018, Hurst signed a four-year contract extension with the Ravens.

In 2019, Hurst was demoted to a backup role after being overtaken on the depth chart, starting only two games at left tackle.

On February 14, 2020, Hurst was suspended the first four games of the 2020 season for violating the NFL's policy on performance-enhancing substances. He was released on March 16, 2020.

New Orleans Saints

Hurst signed with the New Orleans Saints on May 28, 2020. He was reinstated from suspension on October 5, and was activated on October 12.

On March 15, 2021, Hurst signed a three-year contract extension with the Saints.

NFL career statistics

References

External links
North Carolina Tar Heels bio

1991 births
Living people
People from Plainfield, Indiana
American football offensive tackles
North Carolina Tar Heels football players
Players of American football from Indiana
Baltimore Ravens players
New Orleans Saints players